

Day 1 (18 January)

 Seeds out:
 Men's Singles:  Benoît Paire [17],  Ivo Karlović [22]
 Women's Singles:  Caroline Wozniacki [16],  Sara Errani [17],  Andrea Petkovic [22],  Sloane Stephens [24],  Samantha Stosur [25],  Anastasia Pavlyuchenkova [26],  Anna Karolína Schmiedlová [27]
 Schedule of Play

Day 2 (19 January)

 Seeds out:
 Men's Singles:  Rafael Nadal [5],  Kevin Anderson [11],  Fabio Fognini [20]
 Women's Singles:  Simona Halep [2],  Venus Williams [8],  Irina-Camelia Begu [29],  Lesia Tsurenko [31],  Caroline Garcia [32]
 Schedule of Play

Day 3 (20 January)

 Seeds out:
 Women's Singles:  Petra Kvitová [6],  Svetlana Kuznetsova [23]
 Women's Doubles:  Gabriela Dabrowski /  Alicja Rosolska [16]
 Schedule of Play

Day 4 (21 January)

 Seeds out:
 Men's Singles:  Jack Sock [25],  Jérémy Chardy [30]
 Women's Singles:  Timea Bacsinszky [11],  Elina Svitolina [18],  Jelena Janković [19],  Sabine Lisicki [30]
 Women's Doubles:  Lara Arruabarrena /  Andreja Klepač [8],  Irina-Camelia Begu /  Monica Niculescu [9],  Kiki Bertens /  Johanna Larsson [14]
 Schedule of Play

Day 5 (22 January)

 Seeds out:
 Men's Singles:  Marin Čilić [12],  Dominic Thiem [19],  Guillermo García-López [26],  Grigor Dimitrov [27],  Andreas Seppi [28],  Nick Kyrgios [29]
 Women's Singles:  Roberta Vinci [13],  Kristina Mladenovic [28]
 Women's Doubles:  Tímea Babos /  Katarina Srebotnik [4]
 Schedule of Play

Day 6 (23 January)

 Seeds out:
 Men's Singles:  Feliciano López [18],  Viktor Troicki [21],  Steve Johnson [31],  João Sousa [32]
 Women's Singles:  Garbiñe Muguruza [3],  Karolína Plíšková [9],  Ana Ivanovic [20]
 Men's Doubles:  Simone Bolelli /  Fabio Fognini [5],  Pierre-Hugues Herbert /  Nicolas Mahut [6],  Henri Kontinen /  John Peers [8],  Łukasz Kubot /  Marcin Matkowski [10]
 Women's Doubles:  Raquel Atawo /  Abigail Spears [6],  Yaroslava Shvedova /  Samantha Stosur [11]
 Mixed Doubles:  Chan Hao-ching /  Max Mirnyi [8]
 Schedule of Play

Day 7 (24 January)

 Seeds out:
 Men's Singles:  Jo-Wilfried Tsonga [9],  Gilles Simon [14],  David Goffin [15],  Roberto Bautista Agut [24]
 Women's Singles:  Belinda Bencic [12]
 Men's Doubles:  Ivan Dodig /  Marcelo Melo [2],  Rohan Bopanna /  Florin Mergea [4],  Feliciano López /  Marc López [15]
 Women's Doubles:  Anabel Medina Garrigues /  Arantxa Parra Santonja [10]
 Mixed Doubles:  Lucie Hradecká  /  Marcin Matkowski [6],  Raquel Atawo /  Raven Klaasen [7]
 Schedule of Play

Day 8 (25 January)

 Seeds out:
 Men's Singles:  Stan Wawrinka [4],  John Isner [10],  Bernard Tomic [16]
 Women's Singles:  Madison Keys [15],  Ekaterina Makarova [21]
 Men's Doubles:  Bob Bryan /  Mike Bryan [3],   Dominic Inglot /  Robert Lindstedt [11],  Juan Sebastián Cabal /  Robert Farah [12]
 Women's Doubles:  Caroline Garcia /  Kristina Mladenovic [3],  Anastasia Pavlyuchenkova /  Elena Vesnina [5]
 Schedule of Play

Day 9 (26 January)

 Seeds out:
 Men's Singles:  Tomáš Berdych [6],  Kei Nishikori [7]
 Women's Singles:  Maria Sharapova [5],  Carla Suárez Navarro [10]
 Men's Doubles:  Jean-Julien Rojer /  Horia Tecău [1],  Vasek Pospisil /  Jack Sock [9],  Raven Klaasen /  Rajeev Ram [13],  Treat Huey /  Max Mirnyi [14] 
 Women's Doubles:  Chan Hao-ching /  Chan Yung-jan [2],  Anna-Lena Grönefeld /  Coco Vandeweghe [12]
 Schedule of Play

Day 10 (27 January)

 Seeds out:
 Men's Singles:  David Ferrer [8],  Gaël Monfils [23]
 Women's Singles:  Victoria Azarenka [14]
 Women's Doubles:  Julia Görges /  Karolína Plíšková [13],  Xu Yifan /  Zheng Saisai [15]
 Mixed Doubles:  Bethanie Mattek-Sands /  Bob Bryan [2],  Chan Yung-jan  /  Rohan Bopanna [3],  Katarina Srebotnik  /  Jamie Murray [4]
 Schedule of Play

Day 11 (28 January)

 Seeds out:
 Men's Singles:  Roger Federer [3]
 Women's Singles:  Agnieszka Radwańska [4]
 Men's Doubles:  Pablo Cuevas /  Marcel Granollers [16]
 Schedule of Play

Day 12 (29 January)

 Seeds out:
 Men's Singles:  Milos Raonic [13]
 Women's Doubles:  Andrea Hlaváčková /  Lucie Hradecká [7]
 Mixed Doubles:  Sania Mirza /  Ivan Dodig [1]
 Schedule of Play

Day 13 (30 January)

 Seeds out:
 Women's Singles:  Serena Williams [1]
 Schedule of Play

Day 14 (31 January)

 Seeds out:
 Men's Singles:  Andy Murray [2]
 Schedule of Play 

Day-by-day summaries
Australian Open (tennis) by year – Day-by-day summaries